Erev Shel Shoshanim ( or Evening of Roses; the Hebrew word shoshana has been identified with both flowers) is a poetic Hebrew love song. Its melody is often used as wedding music in Jewish weddings. It is well known not only within Israeli and Jewish music circles, but known throughout the Middle East, and it is often used as a song belly dancers dance to. 

The music is by Yosef Hadar, the lyrics are by Moshe Dor. The song was first recorded in 1957 by singer Yafa Yarkoni, and a year later by the duo HaDuda'im. Their version became a smash hit in Israel. The Dudaim toured the world extensively in the '60s, and "Erev shel Shoshanim" became one of their international signature songs.  

In 1966, the Israeli folk dancing choreographer Zvi Hillman created the first folk dance based on the song.

Other versions of the song
During the '60s and '70s the song was recorded by various international singers, including Harry Belafonte, Olivera Katarina, Nana Mouskouri, Daliah Lavi, Victor Jara and Quilapayún, Martin Simpson and Miriam Makeba. In 1974, Yugoslav progressive rock band Dah recorded their hit song "Šošana", which featured melody based on "Erev Shel Shoshanim". In 1975, after moving to Belgium and changing the name to Land, the band recorded an English-language version of "Šošana" (entitled "Shoshana"), which became an international hit and made the song's melody a popular football chant.

The song has been translated into Armenian, in which language its title is "Yarus (O, Rose!)".

Juhani Forsberg used the melody, which he thought to be an Israeli folksong, in his song "Tiellä ken vaeltaa", which has since ended up in the hymnbook of Evangelical Lutheran Church of Finland.

A version of the song was also sampled in the 2016 hit song, "Save Me" by French pop artist The Parakit.

Lyrics

English translation
Evening of roses
Let us go out to the grove
Myrrh, perfumes, and Frankincense
Is the carpet under your feet

Night falls slowly
And a wind of rose blows
Let me whisper a song for you slowly
A song of love

Dawn and the dove coos
Your hair is full of dewdrops
Your lips are as roses unto the morning
I will pick them for myself

English transliteration
Erev shel shoshanim
Netse na el habustan
Mor besamim ulevona
Leraghelech miftan

Layla yored le'at
Veru'ach shoshan noshvah
Hava elchash lach shir balat
Zemer shel ahava

Shachar homa yona
Roshech ma'le telalim
Pich el haboker shoshana
Ektefenu li

Original Hebrew
ערב של שושנים 
נצא נא אל הבוסתן 
מור בשמים ולבונה 
.לרגלך מפתן

לילה יורד לאט 
ורוח שושן נושבה 
הבה אלחש לך שיר בלאט 
.זמר של אהבה

שחר הומה יונה 
ראשך מלא טללים 
פיך אל הבוקר, שושנה 
.אקטפנו לי

References

External links
Hebrew Lyrics
A singable (rhyming) English translation
The song in the "Israelidances" database

"The song in the web hymn book of Evangalical Lutheran Church of Finland"

Hebrew-language songs
Israeli songs
1957 songs